is a passenger railway station in located in the city of Shima,  Mie Prefecture, Japan, operated by the private railway operator Kintetsu Railway.

Lines
The station is 66.0 rail kilometers from the opposing terminus of the Shima Line at Ise-Nakagawa Station.

Station layout
The station consists of four ground-level bay platforms serving 5 tracks. The floor is almost flat between the platforms and north entrance.

Platforms

Adjacent stations

History
Kashikojima Station opened on July 23, 1929 as a station on the Shima Electric Railway. The line was one of six private companies consolidated into Mie Kotsu by order of the Japanese government on February 11, 1944. When Mie Kotsu dissolved on February 1, 1964, the station became part of the Mie Electric Railway, which was then acquired by Kintetsu on April 1, 1965.

Passenger statistics
In fiscal 2019, the station was used by an average of 730 passengers daily (boarding passengers only).

Surrounding area
Shima Kanko Hotel
Shima Marine Land
Ago Bay
Kashikojima Country Club
Goza beach

See also
List of railway stations in Japan

References

External links

 Kintetsu: Kashikojima Station

Railway stations in Japan opened in 1929
Railway stations in Mie Prefecture
Stations of Kintetsu Railway
Shima, Mie